Properidine is an opioid, an analgesic, and the isopropyl analog of pethidine.  Properidine is under international control and is listed in the United States under the Controlled Substances Act (1970) as a Schedule I substance. It is a narcotic, with an Administrative Controlled Substances Code Number (ACSCN) of 9644 and a 2 gramme annual aggregate manufacturing quota as of 2014. The salt in use is hydrochloride, with a free base conversion ratio of 0.88.

References

Mu-opioid receptor agonists
Synthetic opioids
4-Phenylpiperidines
Carboxylate esters